Zero Degree Turn or Zero Degree Latitude ( Madâr-e sefr darajeh) is a 2007 television series, made through the cooperation of Iran, Hungary, France, and Lebanon. The program was one of the most expensive and elaborate ever produced by Iran and attracted a large audience there. It is inspired by a real-life story about Iranian diplomat Abdol Hossein Sardari, who saved Jews in 1940s Paris during the Nazi Occupation by giving out Iranian passports and allowing them refuge in the Iranian Embassy. Although it has been noted that neither character names nor the story are close to Sardari's story.

Plot 
Set in the time of the Second World War, Madare Sefr Darajeh follows the life of an Iranian student named Habib Parsa (Shahab Hosseini) who travels to Paris to study.  There Habib meets a French Jewish woman named Sara Astrok, a student at the same university. At first antagonistic toward one another, Habib and Sarah eventually fall in love. They run into many problems, including persecution by the Nazis and by Sarah's Zionist uncle, but are united in the end.

Cast
Shahab Hosseini - Habib Parsa
Nathalie Matti - Sara Astrok
Roya Taymourian - Asieh
Masoud Rayegan - Mohammadhoseyn Parsa
Pierre Dagher - Behruz fattahi
Layazangane - ziant-ol-molok
Ateneh-faghih-nasiri - saide

Opinions 
The government financed film has been widely cited as an effort by the government to demonstrate its positions in regards to the difference between Jews and Zionists, encompassing sympathy for the Jewish people (including an orthodox view of the Holocaust) while remaining hostile to Zionism.

The director of the series, Hassan Fathi, said about it, "I decided to produce this series in 2002, and in those days the Holocaust was not an issue. Even if one single Jew is killed in German camps, the world should be ashamed. By the same token, if a single Palestinian dies, the world should be ashamed. I sympathize with the Jewish victims of World War II, to the same extent with women and children victims of the war in Palestine."

The TV series won the praise and support of Iran's Jewish Association, an independent body that safeguards the community's culture and heritage. The association has criticized Mr. Ahmadinejad's comments about the Holocaust but has praised Mr. Fatthi's show.

DVD release 
The series was retitled Zero Point Orbit for its 2007 release by Bita Film, Tarzana, California. The Persian title is unchanged. The DVDs include neither English nor Persian subtitles.

English dub 
The series has an English dub that was recorded in Hong Kong by Red Angel Media.

References

External links 

Official site
Iran Holocaust drama is a big hit – BBC News – Friday, 30 November 2007

Iranian television series
Holocaust films
2000s Iranian television series
2007 Iranian television series debuts
2007 Iranian television series endings